Yacas  is a general-purpose computer algebra system.  The name is an acronym for Yet Another Computer Algebra System.

Released under the GNU Lesser General Public License, Yacas is free software.

YACAS is a program for symbolic manipulation of mathematical expressions. It uses its own programming language designed for symbolic as well as arbitrary-precision numerical computations. The system has a library of scripts that implement many of the symbolic algebra operations; new algorithms can be easily added to the library. YACAS comes with extensive documentation covering the scripting language, the functionality that is already implemented in the system, and the algorithms used. Its development started in early 1999.

Yacas handles input and output in plain ASCII or in OpenMath, either interactively or in batch mode.

Some features

See also

Comparison of computer algebra systems

References

External links

Mathpiper A fork of Yacas in Java.

Computer algebra system software for Linux
Free computer algebra systems
Free software programmed in C++
Free mathematics software